Harold Hooper (18 August 1900 – 1963) was an English footballer who played at full-back for various clubs in the 1920s. He was known to supporters as "Rufus" because of the colour of his hair.

Football career
Hooper was born in Brierley Hill, Staffordshire and played for Brierley Hill Alliance before moving to the south coast to join Southampton in May 1921.

At The Dell, Hooper provided cover for the well-established full-backs, Tom Parker and Fred Titmuss and found it hard to break into the first-team. He made his debut at Watford on 22 October 1921, replacing Parker at right-back, followed by three further league appearances later in the season. Hooper's longest runs in the side came with five matches in September 1922, playing at left-back in place of Titmuss and four matches in December at right-back.

After three frustrating seasons in which he only made twenty appearances, Hooper moved back to the Midlands to join Leicester City in May 1926 as part of the deal that brought winger Fred Price and half-back Dennis Jones to the south coast. At Filbert Street, Hooper was considered to be "dour and resolute", making 33 League appearances before joining Queens Park Rangers in May 1926.

Family
Hooper was a cousin to Charlie Roberts, who played for Manchester United and England.

References

1900 births
1963 deaths
People from Brierley Hill
English footballers
English Football League players
Southampton F.C. players
Leicester City F.C. players
Queens Park Rangers F.C. players
Association football fullbacks